Rhapsodie for saxophone and orchestra, L.98, also known as Rhapsodie mauresque or Rhapsodie orientale, is a piece for alto saxophone and accompaniment by Claude Debussy. Completed in solo and piano form in 1911, the piece is most well known through its 1919 orchestration of the accompaniment by Jean Roger-Ducasse.

History 
Commissioning a number of composers such as André Caplet and Vincent d'Indy, in 1901 American saxophonist Elise Hall had requested Debussy to compose a piece for the saxophone. During the process of composition, Debussy is noted to have not looked favorably upon the abilities of either Hall nor the saxophone, and did not work on the commission for months. After a number of visits by Hall to Paris, Debussy had given her a score of Pelléas et Mélisande and continued working on Rhapsodie. Debussy had finished the piece's sketches in 1908, but had resumed and completed the saxophone and piano score in 1911, eventually sending the score off to Hall.

After Debussy's death in 1918, Jean Roger-Ducasse orchestrated the piano accompaniment for a full orchestra in 1919. Rhapsodie eventually premiered on May 14, 1919, at the Salle Gaveau by the Société nationale de musique, conducted by André Caplet. Rather than Elise Hall, who at the time of the premier had become entirely deaf, Pierre Mayeur had played the solo saxophone part during the first performance.

Instrumentation 
Jean Roger-Ducasse's orchestration calls for:

 Solo alto saxophone
 3 flutes (one doubling piccolo), 2 oboes, cor anglais, 2 clarinets, 2 bassoons
 4 horns, 2 trumpets, 3 trombones, tuba
 Timpani, triangle, tambourine, cymbals
 Harp
 strings

References

External links 
Full Score

Compositions by Claude Debussy
Compositions for saxophone
Rhapsodies
1919 compositions